This is a list of the longest-running Indian television programs, ordered by number of years the show has been aired. This list includes only series broadcast in India with 1000 episodes either a three-year run completed series.

Hindi

Non-fiction

Fiction

Telugu

Non-fiction

Fiction

Tamil

Kannada

Malayalam

Marathi

Bengali

Odia

Gujarati

Assamese

See also

 List of longest-running television shows by category – international list
 List of television programs by episode count – international list
 List of longest-running United States television series
 List of longest-running UK television series
 List of longest-running Spanish television series
 List of longest-running Australian television series
 List of longest-running Philippine television series

References

Indian